The 2018 Vuelta a España was the 73rd edition of the Vuelta a España, one of cycling's Grand Tours. The Vuelta began in Málaga, with an individual time trial on 25 August, and Stage 11 occurred on 5 September with a stage to Ribeira Sacra/Luíntra. The race finished in Madrid on 16 September.

Classification standings

Stage 1
25 August 2018 — Málaga to Málaga,  (ITT)

Stage 2
26 August 2018 — Marbella to Caminito del Rey, 

The route turned west and then north to Alozaina, then east through  to Pizarra. The race then turned north to El Chorro, then west to the first climb of the category 3 Alto de Guadalhorce, and then passed through the finish line for the first time. The route then wound north before turning back south and passing over the category 3 Alto de Ardales, and descended south to start the second pass of the route east from Zalea. The race had an intermediate sprint at Pizarra, before continuing north to El Chorro and turning west for the final climb of the category 3 Alto de Guadalhorce.

Stage 3
27 August 2018 — Mijas to Alhaurín de la Torre,

Stage 4
28 August 2018 — Vélez-Málaga to Alfacar,

Stage 5
29 August 2018 — Granada to Roquetas de Mar,

Stage 6
30 August 2018 — Huércal-Overa to San Javier,

Stage 7
31 August 2018 — Puerto Lumbreras to Pozo Alcón,

Stage 8
1 September 2018 — Linares to Almadén,

Stage 9
2 September 2018 — Talavera de la Reina to La Covatilla,

Rest day 1
3 September 2018 — Salamanca

Dan Martin retired from the race on the first rest day.

Stage 10
4 September 2018 — Salamanca to Fermoselle,

Stage 11
5 September 2018 — Mombuey to Ribeira Sacra/Luíntra,

Notes

References

2018 Vuelta a España
Vuelta a España stages